Garrett Wareing (born August 31, 2001) is an American actor, best known for his role as Stetson "Stet" Tate in the 2014 film Boychoir, as Zach in Pretty Little Liars: The Perfectionists and as TJ Morrison in season 2 and 4 of Manifest.

Screen career
Wareing made his film debut in 2013 appearing in two short films Sweet Dreams and The Origami Master. In 2014, he played Stetson "Stet" Tate in the film Boychoir, he also appeared in two short films Saudade and Hidden. In 2016, he appeared in the film Independence Day: Resurgence. Wareing does also play a leading character Zach in Pretty Little Liars: The Perfectionists and played the role of TJ Morrison in season 2 of Manifest.

Filmography

Film

Television

References

External links
 

2001 births
Living people
American male film actors
American male television actors
American male voice actors
American male video game actors
Male actors from Texas
People from College Station, Texas